

Events

Pre-1600
 325 – The First Council of Nicaea is formally opened, starting the first ecumenical council of the Christian Church.
 491 – Empress Ariadne marries Anastasius I. The widowed Augusta is able to choose her successor for the Byzantine throne, after Zeno (late emperor) dies of dysentery.
 685 – The Battle of Dun Nechtain is fought between a Pictish army under King Bridei III and the invading Northumbrians under King Ecgfrith, who are decisively defeated.
 794 – While visiting the royal Mercian court at Sutton Walls with a view to marrying princess Ælfthryth, King Æthelberht II of East Anglia is taken captive and beheaded.
1217 – The Second Battle of Lincoln is fought near Lincoln, England, resulting in the defeat of Prince Louis of France by William Marshal, 1st Earl of Pembroke.
1293 – King Sancho IV of Castile creates the Estudio de Escuelas de Generales in Alcalá de Henares.
1426 – King Mohnyin Thado formally ascends to the throne of Ava.
1449 – The Battle of Alfarrobeira is fought, establishing the House of Braganza as a principal royal family of Portugal.
1497 – John Cabot sets sail from Bristol, England, on his ship  looking for a route to the west (other documents give a May 2 date).
1498 – Portuguese explorer Vasco da Gama discovers the sea route to India when he arrives at Kozhikode (previously known as Calicut), India.
1520 – Hernando Cortes defeats Panfilo de Narvaez, sent by Spain to punish him for insubordination. 
1521 – Ignatius of Loyola is seriously wounded in the Battle of Pampeluna.
1570 – Cartographer Abraham Ortelius issues Theatrum Orbis Terrarum, the first modern atlas.

1601–1900
1609 – Shakespeare's sonnets are first published in London, perhaps illicitly, by the publisher Thomas Thorpe.
1631 – The city of Magdeburg in Germany is seized by forces of the Holy Roman Empire and most of its inhabitants massacred, in one of the bloodiest incidents of the Thirty Years' War.
1645 – Yangzhou massacre: The ten day massacre of 800,000 residents of the city of Yangzhou, part of the Transition from Ming to Qing.
1741 – The Battle of Cartagena de Indias ends in a Spanish victory and the British begin withdrawal towards Jamaica with substantial losses. 
1775 – The Mecklenburg Declaration of Independence is allegedly signed in Charlotte, North Carolina.
1802 – By the Law of 20 May 1802, Napoleon Bonaparte reinstates slavery in the French colonies, revoking its abolition in the French Revolution.
1813 – Napoleon Bonaparte leads his French troops into the Battle of Bautzen in Saxony, Germany, against the combined armies of Russia and Prussia. The battle ends the next day with a French victory.
1840 – York Minster is badly damaged by fire.
1861 – American Civil War: The state of Kentucky proclaims its neutrality, which will last until September 3 when Confederate forces enter the state. Meanwhile, the State of North Carolina secedes from the Union.
1862 – U.S. President Abraham Lincoln signs the Homestead Act into law, opening 84 million acres of public land to settlers.
1864 – American Civil War: Battle of Ware Bottom Church: In the Virginia Bermuda Hundred campaign, 10,000 troops fight in this Confederate victory.
1873 – Levi Strauss and Jacob Davis receive a U.S. patent for blue jeans with copper rivets.
1875 – Signing of the Metre Convention by 17 nations leading to the establishment of the International System of Units.
1882 – The Triple Alliance between the German Empire, Austria-Hungary and the Kingdom of Italy is formed.
1883 – Krakatoa begins to erupt; the volcano explodes three months later, killing more than 36,000 people.
1891 – History of cinema: The first public display of Thomas Edison's prototype kinetoscope.

1901–present
1902 – Cuba gains independence from the United States. Tomás Estrada Palma becomes the country's first President.
1927 – Treaty of Jeddah: The United Kingdom recognizes the sovereignty of King Ibn Saud in the Kingdoms of Hejaz and Nejd, which later merge to become the Kingdom of Saudi Arabia.
1927 – Charles Lindbergh takes off for Paris from Roosevelt Field in Long Island, N.Y., aboard the Spirit of St. Louis on the first nonstop solo flight across the Atlantic Ocean, landing  hours later. 
1932 – Amelia Earhart takes off from Newfoundland to begin the world's first solo nonstop flight across the Atlantic Ocean by a female pilot, landing in Ireland the next day.
1940 – The Holocaust: The first prisoners arrive at a new concentration camp at Auschwitz.
1941 – World War II: Battle of Crete: German paratroops invade Crete.
1943 – The Luttra Woman, a bog body from the Early Neolithic period (radiocarbon-dated ), was discovered near Luttra, Sweden.
1948 – Generalissimo Chiang Kai-shek wins the 1948 Republic of China presidential election and is sworn in as the first President of the Republic of China at Nanjing.
1949 – In the United States, the Armed Forces Security Agency, the predecessor to the National Security Agency, is established.
1956 – In Operation Redwing, the first United States airborne hydrogen bomb is dropped over Bikini Atoll in the Pacific Ocean.
1964 – Discovery of the cosmic microwave background radiation by Robert Woodrow Wilson and Arno Penzias.
1965 – One hundred twenty-one people are killed when Pakistan International Airlines Flight 705 crashes at Cairo International Airport.
1967 – The Popular Movement of the Revolution political party is established in the Democratic Republic of the Congo.
1969 – The Battle of Hamburger Hill in Vietnam ends.
1971 – In the Chuknagar massacre, Pakistani forces massacre thousands, mostly Bengali Hindus.
1980 – In a referendum in Quebec, the population rejects, by 60% of the vote, a government proposal to move towards independence from Canada.
1983 – First publications of the discovery of the HIV virus that causes AIDS in the journal Science by a team of French scientists including Françoise Barré-Sinoussi, Jean-Claude Chermann, and Luc Montagnier.
  1983   – Church Street bombing: A car bomb planted by Umkhonto we Sizwe explodes on Church Street in South Africa's capital, Pretoria, killing 19 people and injuring 217 others.
1985 – Radio Martí, part of the Voice of America service, begins broadcasting to Cuba.
1989 – The Chinese authorities declare martial law in the face of pro-democracy demonstrations, setting the scene for the Tiananmen Square massacre.
1990 – The first post-Communist presidential and parliamentary elections are held in Romania.
1996 – Civil rights: The Supreme Court of the United States rules in Romer v. Evans against a law that would have prevented any city, town or county in the state of Colorado from taking any legislative, executive, or judicial action to protect the rights of gays and lesbians.
2002 – The independence of East Timor is recognized by Portugal, formally ending 23 years of Indonesian rule and three years of provisional UN administration (Portugal itself is the former colonizer of East Timor until 1976).
2011 – Mamata Banerjee is sworn in as the Chief Minister of West Bengal, the first woman to hold this post. 
2012 – At least 27 people are killed and 50 others injured when a 6.0-magnitude earthquake strikes northern Italy.
2013 – An EF5 tornado strikes the Oklahoma City suburb of Moore, killing 24 people and injuring 377 others.
2016 – The government of Singapore authorised the controversial execution of convicted murderer Kho Jabing for the murder of a Chinese construction worker despite the international pleas for clemency, notably from Amnesty International and the United Nations.
2019 – The International System of Units (SI): The base units are redefined, making the international prototype of the kilogram obsolete.
2022 – Russo-Ukrainian War: Russia claims full control of the Ukrainian city of Mariupol after a nearly three-month siege.

Births

Pre-1600
1315 – Bonne of Luxembourg, first wife of John II of France (d. 1349)
1470 – Pietro Bembo, Italian cardinal, poet, and scholar (d. 1547)
1505 – Levinus Lemnius, Dutch writer (d. 1568)
1531 – Thado Minsaw of Ava, Viceroy of Ava (d. 1584)
1537 – Hieronymus Fabricius, Italian anatomist (d. 1619)
1575 – Robert Heath, English judge and politician (d. 1649)

1601–1900
1664 – Andreas Schlüter, German sculptor and architect (d. 1714)
1726 – Francis Cotes, English painter and academic (d. 1770)
1759 – William Thornton, Virgin Islander-American architect, designed the United States Capitol (d. 1828)
1769 – Andreas Vokos Miaoulis, Greek admiral and politician (d. 1835)
1772 – Sir William Congreve, 2nd Baronet, English inventor and politician, developed Congreve rockets (d. 1828)
1776 – Simon Fraser, American-Canadian fur trader and explorer (d. 1862)
1795 – Pedro María de Anaya, Mexican soldier. President (1847–1848) (d. 1854)
1799 – Honoré de Balzac, French novelist and playwright (d. 1850)
1806 – John Stuart Mill, English economist, civil servant, and philosopher (d. 1873)
1811 – Alfred Domett, English-New Zealand poet and politician, 4th Prime Minister of New Zealand (d. 1887)
1818 – William Fargo, American businessman and politician, co-founded Wells Fargo and American Express (d. 1881)
1822 – Frédéric Passy, French economist and academic, Nobel Prize laureate (d. 1912)
1824 – Cadmus M. Wilcox, Confederate States Army general (d. 1890)
1825 – Antoinette Brown Blackwell, the first woman to be ordained as a mainstream Protestant minister in the U.S. (d. 1921)
1830 – Hector Malot, French author (d. 1907)
1838 – Jules Méline, French lawyer and politician, 65th Prime Minister of France (d. 1925)
1851 – Emile Berliner, German-American inventor, invented the Gramophone record (d. 1929)
1854 – George Prendergast, Australian politician, 28th Premier of Victoria (d. 1937)
1856 – Henri-Edmond Cross, French Neo-Impressionist painter (d. 1910)
1860 – Eduard Buchner, German chemist, zymologist, and academic, Nobel Prize laureate (d. 1917)
1875 – Hendrik Offerhaus, Dutch rower (d. 1953)
1877 – Pat Leahy, Irish-American jumper (d. 1927)
1879 – Hans Meerwein, German chemist (d. 1965)
1882 – Sigrid Undset, Danish-Norwegian novelist, essayist, and translator, Nobel Prize laureate (d. 1949)
1883 – Faisal I of Iraq (d. 1933)
1886 – Ali Sami Yen, Turkish footballer and manager, founded the Galatasaray Sports Club (d. 1951)
1894 – Chandrashekarendra Saraswati, Indian guru and scholar (d. 1994)
1895 – R. J. Mitchell, English engineer, designed the Supermarine Spitfire and Supermarine S.6B (d. 1937)
1897 – Diego Abad de Santillán, Spanish economist and author (d. 1983)
  1897   – Malcolm Nokes, English hammer and discus thrower (d. 1986)
1898 – Eduard Ole, Estonian painter (d. 1995)
1899 – Aleksandr Deyneka, Russian painter and sculptor (d. 1969)
  1899   – John Marshall Harlan II, American lawyer and jurist (d. 1971)
1900 – Sumitranandan Pant, Indian poet and author (d. 1977)

1901–present
1901 – Max Euwe, Dutch chess player, mathematician, and author (d. 1981)
  1901   – Doris Fleeson, American journalist (d. 1970)
1904 – Margery Allingham, English author of detective fiction (d. 1966)
1906 – Giuseppe Siri, Italian cardinal (d. 1989)
1907 – Carl Mydans, American photographer and journalist (d. 2004)
1908 – Henry Bolte, Australian politician, 38th Premier of Victoria (d. 1990)
  1908   – Louis Daquin, French actor and director (d. 1980)
  1908   – Francis Raymond Fosberg, American botanist and author (d. 1993)
  1908   – James Stewart, American actor (d. 1997)
1911 – Gardner Fox, American author (d. 1986)
  1911   – Annie M. G. Schmidt, Dutch author and playwright (d. 1995)
1913 – Teodoro Fernández, Peruvian footballer (d. 1996)
  1913   – William Redington Hewlett, American engineer, co-founded Hewlett-Packard (d. 2001)
  1913   – Carlos J. Gradin, Argentine Archaeologist (d. 2002)
1915 – Peter Copley, English actor (d. 2008)
  1915   – Moshe Dayan, Israeli general and politician, 5th Israeli Minister of Foreign Affairs (d. 1981)
  1915   – Joff Ellen, Australian comedian and actor (d. 1999)
1916 – Owen Chadwick, English rugby player, historian, and academic (d. 2015)
  1916   – Alexey Maresyev, Russian soldier and pilot (d. 2001)
  1916   – Ondina Valla, Italian sprinter and hurdler (d. 2006)
1917 – Tony Cliff, Israeli-English author and activist (d. 2000)
  1917   – Guy Favreau, Canadian lawyer, judge, and politician, 28th Canadian Minister of Justice (d. 1967)
1918 – Alexandra Boyko, Russian tank commander (d. 1996)
  1918   – Edward B. Lewis, American biologist, geneticist, and academic, Nobel Prize laureate (d. 2004)
1919 – George Gobel, American comedian (d. 1991)
1920 – John Cruickshank, Scottish lieutenant and banker, Victoria Cross recipient 
1921 – Wolfgang Borchert, German author and playwright (d. 1947)
  1921   – Hal Newhouser, American baseball player and scout (d. 1998)
  1921   – Pedro Trebbau, German-born Venezuelan zoologist (d. 2021)
  1921   – Hao Wang, Chinese-American logician, philosopher, and mathematician (d. 1995)
1922 – Ted Hinton, Northern Irish international footballer (d. 1988) 
1923 – Edith Fellows, American actress (d. 2011)
  1923   – Sam Selvon, Trinidad-born writer (d. 1994)
1924 – David Chavchavadze, English-American CIA officer and author (d. 2014)
  1924   – Zelmar Michelini, Uruguayan journalist and politician (d. 1976)
1925 – Alexei Tupolev, Russian engineer, designed the Tupolev Tu-144 (d. 2001)
1926 – Bob Sweikert, American race car driver (d. 1956)
1927 – Bud Grant, American football player and coach (d. 2023)
  1927   – David Hedison, American actor (d. 2019)
  1927   – Franciszek Macharski, Polish cardinal (d. 2016)
1929 – Gilles Loiselle, Canadian politician and diplomat, 33rd Canadian Minister of Finance
1930 – Sam Etcheverry, American football player and coach (d. 2009)
1931 – Ken Boyer, American baseball player and manager (d. 1982)
  1931   – Louis Smith, American trumpeter (d. 2016)
1933 – Constance Towers, American actress and singer
1935 – José Mujica, Uruguayan guerrilla leader and politician, 40th President of Uruguay
1936 – Anthony Zerbe, American actor
1937 – Dave Hill, American golfer (d. 2011)
  1937   – Derek Lampe, English footballer 
1939 – Balu Mahendra, Sri Lankan-Indian director, cinematographer, and screenwriter (d. 2014)
1940 – Shorty Long, American singer-songwriter and producer (d. 1969)
  1940   – Stan Mikita, Slovak-Canadian ice hockey player and sportscaster (d. 2018)
  1940   – Sadaharu Oh, Japanese-Taiwanese baseball player and manager
1941 – Goh Chok Tong, Singaporean politician, 2nd Prime Minister of Singapore
  1941   – John Strasberg, American actor and teacher
1942 – Raymond Chrétien, Canadian lawyer and diplomat, Canadian Ambassador to the United States
  1942   – Lynn Davies, Welsh sprinter and long jumper
  1942   – Carlos Hathcock, American sergeant and sniper (d. 1999)
  1942   – Frew McMillan, South African tennis player
1943 – Albano Carrisi, Italian singer, actor, and winemaker
  1943   – Deryck Murray, Trinidadian cricketer
1944 – Joe Cocker, English singer-songwriter (d. 2014)
  1944   – Boudewijn de Groot, Indonesian-Dutch singer-songwriter and guitarist
  1944   – Keith Fletcher, English cricketer and manager
  1944   – Dietrich Mateschitz, Austrian businessman, co-founder of Red Bull GmbH (d. 2022)
1945 – Vladimiro Montesinos, Peruvian intelligence officer
1946 – Cher, American singer-songwriter, producer, and actress
  1946   – Bobby Murcer, American baseball player, coach, manager, and sportscaster (d. 2008)
1947 – Steve Currie, English bass player (d. 1981)
  1947   – Greg Dyke, English journalist and academic
1949 – Robert Morin, Canadian director, cinematographer, and screenwriter
  1949   – Michèle Roberts, English author and poet
  1949   – Dave Thomas, Canadian actor, director, producer, and screenwriter
1950 – Andy Johns, English-American engineer and producer (d. 2013)
  1950   – Reinaldo Merlo, Argentinian footballer and coach
  1950   – Jane Parker-Smith, English organist (d. 2020)
1951 – Thomas Akers, American colonel, engineer, and astronaut
  1951   – Christie Blatchford, Canadian newspaper columnist, journalist and broadcaster (d. 2020)
  1951   – Mike Crapo, American lawyer and politician
1952 – Roger Milla, Cameroonian footballer and manager
  1952   – Michael Wills, English politician, British Minister of Justice
1953 – Robert Doyle, Australian educator and politician, 103rd Lord Mayor of Melbourne
1954 – David Paterson, American lawyer and politician, 55th Governor of New York
  1954   – Colin Sutherland, Lord Carloway, Scottish lawyer and judge
1955 – Steve George, American keyboard player and songwriter
  1955   – Zbigniew Preisner, Polish composer and producer
1956 – Ingvar Ambjørnsen, Norwegian-German author and critic
  1956   – Gerry Peyton, English born Irish international footballer and coach 
  1956   – Douglas Preston, American journalist and author
1957 – Yoshihiko Noda, Japanese lawyer and politician, 62nd Prime Minister of Japan
1958 – Ron Reagan, American journalist and radio host
  1958   – Jane Wiedlin, American singer-songwriter, guitarist, and actress 
1959 – Susan Cowsill, American singer-songwriter
1960 – Tony Goldwyn, American actor and director
1961 – Clive Allen, English international footballer and manager 
  1961   – Nick Heyward, English singer-songwriter and guitarist 
1963 – David Wells, American baseball player and sportscaster
1964 – Kōichirō Genba, Japanese politician, 80th Japanese Minister for Foreign Affairs
  1964   – Edin Osmanović, Slovenian footballer, coach, and manager
  1964   – Charles Spencer, 9th Earl Spencer, English journalist and author
1965 – Ted Allen, American television host and author
  1965   – Stu Grimson, Canadian ice hockey player, sportscaster, and lawyer
1966 – Dan Abrams, American journalist and author
1967 – Graham Brady, English politician
  1967   – Gabriele Muccino, Italian director, producer, and screenwriter
1968 – Timothy Olyphant, American actor and producer
1969 – Road Dogg, American wrestler, producer, and soldier
1970 – Terrell Brandon, American basketball player
  1970   – Louis Theroux, Singaporean-English journalist and producer
1971 – Šárka Kašpárková, Czech triple jumper and coach
  1971   – Tony Stewart, American race car driver
1972 – Michael Diamond, Australian shooter
  1972   – Christophe Dominici, French rugby player (d. 2020)
  1972   – Busta Rhymes, American rapper, producer, and actor
1973 – Nathan Long, Australian rugby league player
1974 – Allison Amend, American novelist and short story writer
  1974   – Shiboprosad Mukherjee, Indian film director, writer and actor
1975 – Juan Minujín, Argentinian actor, director, and screenwriter
1976 – Ramón Hernández, Venezuelan-American baseball player
  1976   – Tomoya Satozaki, Japanese baseball player
1977 – Matt Czuchry, American actor
  1977   – Leo Franco, Argentinian footballer
  1977   – Angela Goethals, American actress
  1977   – Stirling Mortlock, Australian rugby player
  1977   – Vesa Toskala, Finnish ice hockey player
1978 – Hristos Banikas, Greek chess player
  1978   – Pavla Hamáčková-Rybová, Czech pole vaulter
  1978   – Nils Schumann, German runner
1979 – Andrew Scheer, Canadian politician, 28th Leader of the Conservative Party of Canada
  1979   – Jayson Werth, American baseball player
1980 – Austin Kearns, American baseball player
  1980   – Kassim Osgood, American football player
1981 – Iker Casillas, Spanish footballer
  1981   – Rachel Platten, American singer and songwriter 
  1981   – Lindsay Taylor, American basketball player
  1981   – Mark Winterbottom, Australian race car driver
1982 – Petr Čech, Czech footballer
  1982   – Imran Farhat, Pakistani cricketer
  1982   – Jessica Raine, English actress
  1982   – Daniel Ribeiro, Brazilian director, producer, and screenwriter
1983 – Óscar Cardozo, Paraguayan footballer
  1983   – Matt Langridge, English rower
1984 – Mauro Rafael da Silva, Brazilian footballer
  1984   – Patrick Ewing Jr., American basketball player
  1984   – Keith Grennan, American football player
1985 – Chris Froome, Kenyan-English cyclist
  1985   – Brendon Goddard, Australian footballer
1986 – Dexter Blackstock, English footballer
  1986   – Stéphane Mbia, Cameroonian footballer
  1986   – Jiřina Svobodová, Czech pole vaulter
1987 – Mike Havenaar, Japanese footballer
  1987   – Julian Wright, American basketball player
1988 – Joel Moon, Australian rugby league player
1989 – Siosia Vave, Australian-Tongan rugby league player
1991 – Bastian Baker, Swiss singer, songwriter, and performer
  1991   – Emre Colak, Turkish footballer
1992 – Cate Campbell, Malawian-Australian swimmer
  1992   – Jack Gleeson, Irish actor
  1992   – Enes Kanter, Turkish basketball player
1993 – Caroline Zhang, American figure skater
1996 – Brian Kelly, Australian rugby league player
1998 – Jamie Chadwick, English race car driver
  1998   – Nam Nguyen, Canadian figure skater

Deaths

Pre-1600
 685 – Ecgfrith of Northumbria (b. 645)
 794 – Æthelberht II, king of East Anglia
 965 – Gero the Great, Saxon ruler (b.c. 900)
1062 – Bao Zheng, Chinese magistrate and mayor of Kaifeng (b. 999)
1277 – Pope John XXI (b. 1215)
1285 – John I of Cyprus (b. 1259)
1291 – Sufi Saint Sayyid Jalaluddin Surkh-Posh Bukhari
1366 – Maria of Calabria, Empress of Constantinople (b. 1329)
1444 – Bernardino of Siena, Italian-Spanish missionary and saint (b. 1380)
1449 – Álvaro Vaz de Almada, 1st Count of Avranches
  1449   – Infante Pedro, Duke of Coimbra (b. 1392)
1501 – Columba of Rieti, Italian Dominican tertiary Religious Sister (b. 1467)
1503 – Lorenzo di Pierfrancesco de' Medici, Italian banker and politician (b. 1463)
1506 – Christopher Columbus, Italian explorer, early European explorer of the Americas (b. 1451)
1550 – Ashikaga Yoshiharu, Japanese shōgun (b. 1510)
1579 – Isabella Markham, English courtier (b. 1527)

1601–1900
1622 – Osman II, Ottoman sultan (b. 1604)
1645 – Shi Kefa, Chinese general and calligrapher (b. 1601)
1648 – Władysław IV Vasa, Polish son of Sigismund III Vasa (b. 1595)
1677 – George Digby, 2nd Earl of Bristol, Spanish-English politician, English Secretary of State (b. 1612)
1713 – Thomas Sprat, English bishop (b. 1635)
1717 – John Trevor, Welsh lawyer and politician, 102nd Speaker of the House of Commons (b. 1637)
1722 – Sébastien Vaillant, French botanist and mycologist (b. 1669)
1732 – Thomas Boston, Scottish author and educator (b. 1676)
1782 – William Emerson, English mathematician and academic (b. 1701)
1793 – Charles Bonnet, Swiss botanist and biologist (b. 1720)
1812 – Count Hieronymus von Colloredo, Austrian archbishop (b. 1732)
1834 – Gilbert du Motier, Marquis de Lafayette, French general (b. 1757)
1841 – Joseph Blanco White, Spanish poet and theologian (b. 1775)
1864 – John Clare, English poet (b. 1793)
1873 – George-Étienne Cartier, Canadian soldier, lawyer, and politician, 9th Premier of East Canada (b. 1814)
1880 – Ana Néri, Brazilian nurse and philanthropist (b. 1814)
1896 – Clara Schumann, German pianist and composer (b. 1819)

1901–present
1909 – Ernest Hogan, American actor and composer (b. 1859)
1917 – Valentine Fleming, Scottish soldier and politician (b. 1887)
  1917   – Philipp von Ferrary, Italian stamp collector (b. 1850)
1924 – Bogd Khan, Mongolian ruler (c. 1869)
1925 – Joseph Howard, Maltese politician, 1st Prime Minister of Malta (b. 1862)
1931 – Ernest Noel, Scottish businessman and politician (b. 1831)
1940 – Verner von Heidenstam, Swedish author and poet, Nobel Prize laureate (b. 1859)
1942 – Hector Guimard, French Architect (b. 1867)
1946 – Jacob Ellehammer, Danish pilot and engineer (b. 1871)
1947 – Philipp Lenard, Slovak-German physicist and academic, Nobel Prize laureate (b. 1862)
  1947   – Georgios Siantos, Greek sergeant and politician (b. 1890)
1949 – Damaskinos of Athens, Greek archbishop and politician, 137th Prime Minister of Greece (b. 1891)
1956 – Max Beerbohm,  English essayist, parodist, and caricaturist (b. 1872)
  1956   – Zoltán Halmay, Hungarian swimmer and trainer (b. 1881)
1961 – Josef Priller, German colonel and pilot (b. 1915)
1964 – Rudy Lewis, American singer (b. 1936)
1971 – Waldo Williams, Welsh poet and academic (b. 1904)
1973 – Renzo Pasolini, Italian motorcycle racer (b. 1938)
  1973   – Jarno Saarinen, Finnish motorcycle racer (b. 1945)
1975 – Barbara Hepworth, English sculptor and lithographer (b. 1903)
1976 – Syd Howe, Canadian ice hockey player (b. 1911)
  1976   – Zelmar Michelini, Uruguayan journalist and politician (b. 1924)
  1976   – Héctor Gutiérrez Ruiz, Uruguayan politician (b. 1934)
1989 – John Hicks, English economist and academic, Nobel Prize laureate (b. 1904)
  1989   – Gilda Radner, American actress and comedian (b. 1946)
1995 – Les Cowie, Australian rugby league player (b. 1925)
1996 – Jon Pertwee, English actor, portrayed the Third Doctor (b. 1919)
1998 – Robert Normann, Norwegian guitarist (b. 1916)
2000 – Jean-Pierre Rampal, French flute player (b. 1922)
  2000   – Malik Sealy, American basketball player and actor (b. 1970)
  2000   – Yevgeny Khrunov, Russian colonel, engineer, and astronaut (b. 1933)
2001 – Renato Carosone, Italian singer-songwriter and pianist (b. 1920)
2002 – Stephen Jay Gould, American paleontologist, biologist, and academic (b. 1941)
2005 – Paul Ricœur, French philosopher and academic (b. 1913)
  2005   – William Seawell, American general (b. 1918)
2007 – Norman Von Nida, Australian golfer (b. 1914)
2008 – Hamilton Jordan, American politician, 8th White House Chief of Staff (b. 1944)
2009 – Arthur Erickson, Canadian architect and urban planner, designed Roy Thomson Hall (b. 1924)
  2009   – Lucy Gordon, American actress and model (b. 1980)
  2009   – Pierre Gamarra, French author, poet, and critic (b. 1919)
2011 – Randy Savage, American wrestler and actor (b. 1952)
2012 – Leela Dube, Indian anthropologist and scholar (b. 1923)
  2012   – Robin Gibb, Manx-English singer-songwriter and producer (b. 1949)
  2012   – David Littman, English-Swiss historian, author, and academic (b. 1933)
  2012   – Ken Lyons, American bass guitarist (b. 1953)
  2012   – Eugene Polley, American engineer, invented the remote control (b. 1915)
  2012   – Andrew B. Steinberg, American lawyer (b. 1958)
2013 – Flavio Costantini, Italian painter and illustrator (b. 1926)
  2013   – Billie Dawe, Canadian ice hockey player and manager (b. 1924)
  2013   – Anders Eliasson, Swedish composer (b. 1947)
  2013   – Miloslav Kříž, Czech basketball player and coach (b. 1924)
  2013   – Ray Manzarek, American singer-songwriter, keyboard player, and producer (b. 1939)
  2013   – Denys Roberts, English judge and politician (b. 1923)
  2013   – Zach Sobiech, American singer-songwriter (b. 1995)
2014 – Sandra Bem, American psychologist and academic (b. 1944)
  2014   – Ross Brown, New Zealand rugby player (b. 1934)
  2014   – Robyn Denny, English-French painter (b. 1930)
  2014   – Arthur Gelb, American journalist, author, and critic (b. 1924)
  2014   – Prince Rupert Loewenstein, Spanish-English businessman (b. 1933)
  2014   – Barbara Murray, English actress (b. 1929)
2015 – Bob Belden, American saxophonist, composer, and producer (b. 1956)
  2015   – Femi Robinson, Nigerian actor and playwright (b. 1940)
2016 – Kho Jabing, Malaysian convicted murderer who was executed by hanging in Singapore (b. 1984)
2019 – Niki Lauda, Austrian race car driver (b. 1949)
2022 – Roger Angell, American sportswriter and author (b. 1920) 
  2022   – Susan Roces, Filipino actress (b. 1941)

Holidays and observances
 Christian feast day:
 Abercius and Helena
 Alcuin of York 
 Aurea of Ostia
 Austregisilus
 Baudilus
 Bernardino of Siena
 Ivo of Chartres
 Lucifer of Cagliari
 Sanctan
 May 20 (Eastern Orthodox liturgics)
 Day of Remembrance (Cambodia)
 Emancipation Day (Florida)
 European Maritime Day (European Council)
 Independence Restoration Day, celebrates the independence of East Timor from Indonesia in 2002.
 Josephine Baker Day (NAACP)
 National Awakening Day (Indonesia), and its related observances:
Indonesian Doctor Day (Indonesia)
 National Day (Cameroon)
 World Bee Day
 World Metrology Day
 In China, May 20 is observed as a celebration of romantic love, because the digits 520 sound similar to "I love you", and it is an important day for romantic gift-giving.

Notes

References

Bibliography

External links

 BBC: On This Day
 
 Historical Events on May 20

Days of the year
May